The Hapsiferinae are a subfamily of moth of the family Tineidae.

Genera
 Agorarcha
 Briaraula
 Callocosmeta
 Chrysocrata
 Cimitra
 Colobocrossa
 Cubitofusa
 Cynomastix
 Dasyses
 Hapsifera
 Hapsiferona
 Paraptica
 Parochmastis
 Phyciodyta
 Pitharcha
 Rhinophyllis
 Tiquadra
 Trachycentra
 Zygosignata

References

, 1991: Zur Taxonomie und Verbreitung der Hapsiferinae† (Lepidoptera, Tineidae). Deutsche Entomologische Zeitschrift 38(1-3): 27–33. Abstract: .